Haywire is a 1980 American television film starring Lee Remick. The film score was composed by Billy Goldenberg. The film was based on the memoir by Brooke Hayward.

Cast
 Lee Remick as Margaret Sullavan
 Jason Robards Jr. as Leland Hayward
 Deborah Raffin as Brooke Hayward
 Dianne Hull as Bridget Hayward
 Hart Bochner as Bill Hayward
 Linda Gray as Nan
 Richard Johnson as Kenneth Wagg
 Dean Jagger as Dr. Kubie
 Christopher Guest as TV Director

Reception
A New York Times TV writer made note of its non-chronological “ambitious time scheme” and called it “an exceptionally fine-tuned television drama.”

References

External links
Haywire at IMDb

1980 television films
1980 films
Films scored by Billy Goldenberg
Films based on biographies
American television films